The Gorizia Statistical Region is a statistical region in western Slovenia, along the border with Italy. It is named after the Italian town of Gorizia (the feminine adjective goriška comes from the Slovenian name for Gorizia: Gorica).

The Julian Alps, the Soča River, and the Vipava Valley are the most prominent natural features of this region.

It contributed just over 5% to total national GDP in 2012, but in terms of GDP per capita it ranked fourth in the country. In the same year, disposable income per capita in the region the highest, in second place behind the Central Slovenia Statistical Region. Housing stock estimates indicate that at the end of 2013 the region had the highest share of dwellings with three or more rooms (around 70%). The share of single-room dwellings was less than 10%. Dwellings here are larger than the Slovenian average, with 37 m² of usable floor space per person on average. The number of cars per 1,000 population is also the highest in Slovenia, with an average of 100 cars more per 1,000 people than in the Central Sava Statistical Region. However, the cars here and in the Lower Sava Statistical Region are also the oldest (on average almost 10 years old in 2013).

The Gorizia Statistical Region is split between the traditional Slovene Littoral and Carniola regions.

Cities and towns 
The Gorizia Statistical Region includes six cities and towns, the largest of which is Nova Gorica.

Municipalities
The Gorizia Statistical Region comprises the following 13 municipalities:

 Ajdovščina
 Bovec
 Brda
 Cerkno
 Idrija
 Kanal
 Kobarid
 Miren-Kostanjevica
 Nova Gorica
 Renče–Vogrsko
 Šempeter-Vrtojba
 Tolmin
 Vipava

Demographics 
The population in 2020 was 118,041. It has a total area of 2,325 km².

Economy 
Employment structure: 59% services, 37.8% industry, 3.2% agriculture.

Tourism 
It attracts 9.8% of the total number of tourists in Slovenia, most being from Italy (41.5%) and Slovenia (20.7%).

Transportation 
 Length of motorways: 44.8 km
 Length of other roads: 3,149 km

Sources 

 Slovenian regions in figures 2014

Statistical regions of Slovenia